The Latin Patriarchate of Ethiopia was a  Latin patriarchal see of the Catholic Church in Ethiopia from 1555 to 1663.

The "archbishopric" was held primarily by Portuguese bishops and all members of the Society of Jesus.

List of Latin Patriarchs of Ethiopia 
All Roman Rite Jesuits.
''Uncanonical: João Bermudes, S.J. (1536? – 1545?; died 1570)
 João Nunes Barreto, S.J. (1555.01 – retired 1557)
 Andrés de Oviedo, S.J. (Spanish; 1562.12.22 – death 1577.06.29), succeeding as former Coadjutor Archbishop of Ethiopia (Ethiopia) (1555.01.23 – 1562.12.22) & Titular Archbishop  of Hierapolis in Syria of the Syrians (1555.01.23 – 1577.06.29)
 Melchior Carneiro (賈耐勞), S.J. (1577 – retired 1581), previously Titular Archbishop of Nicæa (1555.01.23 – 1577) & Auxiliary Bishop of Ethiopia (Ethiopia) (1555.01.23 – 1577); also Apostolic Administrator of Macau 澳門 (Macau, Portuguese China) (1576.01.23 – 1581)
 Afonso Mendes, S.J. (1622.12.19 – retired 1636)

Non-succeeding Coadjutor-Archbishops of Ethiopia 
All were Jesuits, survived by the incumbent Patriarchs. 
 Didacus Secco, S.J. (1622.12.19 – death 1623.07), Titular Archbishop of Nicæa (1622.12.19 – 1623.07)
 João da Rocha, S.J. (1623.03.06 – death 1639.07.20), Titular Archbishop of Hierapolis and Auxiliary Bishop of Goa (1623.03.06 – 1627?)
 Apollinaris de Almeida, S.J. (1627.03.22 – death 1638.06.15), Titular Archbishop of Nicæa (1627.03.22 – 1638.06.15)

See also 
 Ethiopian Orthodox Patriarch-Catholicos of Axum

References

Source and External links 
 GCatholic, with incumbent biography links

Former Latin patriarchates
Former Roman Catholic dioceses in Africa
1555 establishments in Africa